

This is a list of the Pennsylvania state historical markers in Washington County.

This is intended to be a complete list of the official state historical markers placed in Washington County, Pennsylvania by the Pennsylvania Historical and Museum Commission (PHMC). The locations of the historical markers, as well as the latitude and longitude coordinates as provided by the PHMC's database, are included below when available. There are 53 historical markers located in Washington County.

Historical markers

See also

List of Pennsylvania state historical markers
National Register of Historic Places listings in Washington County, Pennsylvania
Washington County History & Landmarks Foundation

References

External links
Pennsylvania Historical Marker Program
Pennsylvania Historical & Museum Commission

Pennsylvania state historical markers in Washington County
Washington County
Pennsylvania state historical markers in Washington County
Tourist attractions in Washington County, Pennsylvania